NGC 4084 is an elliptical galaxy located 315 million light-years away in the constellation Coma Berenices. NGC 4084 was discovered by astronomer Heinrich d'Arrest on April 26, 1865. NGC 4084 is an isolated member of the Coma Supercluster and is classified as a LINER galaxy.

See also
 List of NGC objects (4001–5000)

References

External links

4084
038272
Coma Berenices
Astronomical objects discovered in 1865
Elliptical galaxies
Coma Supercluster
LINER galaxies
Discoveries by Heinrich Louis d'Arrest